Intermittent hypoxic training (IHT), also known as intermittent hypoxic therapy, is a technique aimed at improving human performance by way of adaptation to reduced oxygen.

 Procedure

An IHT session consists of an interval of several minutes breathing hypoxic (low oxygen) air, alternated with intervals breathing ambient (normoxic) or hyperoxic air. The procedure may be repeated several times in variable-length sessions per day, depending on a physician's prescription or a manufacturer's protocol. 
Standard practice is for the patient to remain stationary while breathing hypoxic air via a hand-held mask. The therapy is delivered using a hypoxicator during the day time, allowing the dosage to be monitored. Biofeedback can be delivered using a pulse oximeter.

Effects
A number of effects are reported. It is important to differentiate between physiological adaptations to mild hypoxia and re-oxygenation episodes (i.e., the IHT protocol) and frequent nocturnal suffocation awakenings produced by sleep apnea, which might result in various pathologies.

Applications
IHT has been used to try to improve performance in sports. and has been used in a number of health conditions.

Hardware manufacturers 

 Ai Mediq
 Biomedtech Australia
 Go2 Altitude
 Gooxygen
 Higher Peak
 Hypoxico
 POWERBreathe
 TrainingMask
 SMTEC

See also 
 Buteyko method
 Hypoventilation training

References

Respiratory therapy